Coenotes jakli is a species of moth of the  family Sphingidae. It is known from the Tanimbar Islands.

References

Sphingulini
Moths described in 2007